Holland is an unincorporated community in Chattooga County, in the U.S. state of Georgia.

History
The community was named after Charles I. Holland, an early postmaster. An early variant name was "Holland's Store" after its local country store. A post office was established as Holland's Store in 1879, the name was changed to Holland in 1889, and the post office closed in 1953.

References

Unincorporated communities in Chattooga County, Georgia
Unincorporated communities in Georgia (U.S. state)